Peace Talks may refer to:
 Peace Talks (The Dresden Files), 2020 novel
Peace Talks Radio, US  public radio series
Peace talks or peace process